Horsfieldia borneensis is a species of plant in the family Myristicaceae. It is a tree endemic to Borneo.

References

borneensis
Vulnerable plants
Endemic flora of Borneo
Trees of Borneo
Taxonomy articles created by Polbot